Sheila Hutchins (11 April 1913 – 2 July 1990) was an English writer. She was Cookery Editor of the Daily Express and published many books, notably English Recipes (Methuen, 1967) and Grannie's Kitchen, a series of books covering the regional cookery of England. Her light, anecdotal, witty style was accompanied by a deep knowledge of her subject.

Hutchins died in 1990, aged 77.

References

1913 births
1990 deaths
English food writers
People from Cheshire
Women food writers
English women writers